Captain Man Bahadur Rai AC, MC, IDSM (10 January 1914 – 14 February 2011) was a highly decorated Indian Army Gorkha officer and a recipient of the Ashoka Chakra, the highest peacetime Indian gallantry decoration. Only the fourth Ashoka Chakra recipient to be decorated while living, he was the third Indian Army serviceman and the first Indian Army officer to have been honoured while alive.

Early life
A member of a Rai family in the Darjeeling district, Rai enlisted in the British Indian Army on 17 July 1930, joining the 1st Battalion of 10th Gurkha Rifles.

Second World War
During the Second World War, Rai was promoted to jemadar (now naib subedar) on 1 December 1941. As an acting subedar (paid), he fought in the Burma Campaign, during which he won the Indian Distinguished Service Medal (IDSM). The citation (which was not made public), reads as follows:

10 December 1943

Subedar Manbahadur Rai,  1/10 Gurkha Rifles, 63rd Indian Infantry Brigade, 17th Indian Division

On the 14th November 1943 this G.O. [Gurkha Officer] was 2nd in command of a company which was ordered to counter-attack at night against strong Japanese forces, estimated to be the major part of a battalion and supported by mortars and infantry guns. During the course of the fighting, which lasted the whole of the next day, and during which quite early in the proceedings his company commander was wounded five times, this Officer displayed the greatest coolness, courage and military skill. 
Initially in charge of the mortars and rear [illegible] company H.Q., he kept his Brigade H.Q. fully and continuously in the picture, gauging accurately when extra ammunition was required and organising the evacuation of the wounded. When his company commander was wounded, he ordered him back to Rear H. Q. and took over command. For some hours he kept large numbers of the enemy at bay by his oppositions, ensuring he could not be surrounded, counter-attacking twice, methodically collecting a large quantity of material for identification purposes and finally when ordered to withdraw, pulling out unhurried and with great military precision. All his dead, wounded and material were got away including much enemy material, and the enemy received such a hard blow that he never followed up and indeed has never recovered the position.
Throughout, this Officer’s leadership and military skill was of the highest order.

Subsequently promoted to war-substantive subedar, Rai was awarded the Military Cross (MC) on 8 October 1944. He received the decoration for, among other actions, his command of his company during the Battle of Imphal in the area of Bishnupur, Manipur. Taking command after his company commander had been killed and while he and his unit were pinned down by Japanese machine-gun fire from several bunkers, Rai conducted a reconnaissance mission and located all of the nearby enemy bunkers. After throwing five grenades at the nearest bunkers, he devised a plan of attack and led his company in an attack which eliminated the first line of bunkers. In the full citation, which was not published, Rai was commended for:

...his dash and courage, combined with high qualities of leadership and initiative shown by this Gurkha Officer on all occasions when his company has been in action.

Indian Army service
After Indian independence, Rai's regiment, the 10th Gurkha Rifles, which primarily recruited soldiers of the Rai ethnicity, was allocated to the United Kingdom and became a British Army regiment. Rai opted to serve in the Indian Army, joining the newly re-raised 11th Gorkha Rifles. On 23 August 1948, he received a short-service commission as a second lieutenant in the 11th Gorkhas (seniority from 23 August 1946). He received a regular commission as a lieutenant on 7 February 1951 (seniority from 27 August 1948), and was promoted to captain on 27 August 1954. On 20 November 1956, he was seconded for service with the 8th Battalion of the Assam Rifles, and was then assigned to the Village Guards (Naga Hills, Tuensang Area) on 1 December 1957. He was appointed Officer Commanding Village Guard (Tuensang Wing) on 1 March 1958.

On 3 May 1961, Rai was decorated with the Ashoka Chakra for his heroism while in command of a platoon during the Nagaland Insurgency:

No.   9-Pres/62.—The  President  is  pleased  to  approve  the  award   of  the ASHOKA  CHAKRA,  CLASS  I,  to  the  undermentioned  personnel  for  most conspicuous bravery:

Captain  MAN  BAHADUR  RAI   (IC-5261).  M.C.,  I.D.S.M.,  11th Gorkha  Rifles.(Seconded  to  Assam  Rifles).

(Effective   date  of  award — 3rd  May 1961)

In  April–May  1961, Captain  Man  Bahadur  Rai   (IC-5261)  took  part  in  a series  of  actions  against  a  body  of  hostile  Nagas  who  had  entrenched  themselves  in  a  very  difficult,   densely  wooded,  hilly  region  interspersed  with numerous  ravines. This position  dominated  the  surrounding  area  and  could  not  be  approached except  frontally. On  locating  the  hostile position,  he  pressed  forward  in  its  direction,  threw  two  hand  grenades  killing a  few  hostiles  and  charged  the  position  firing  as  he  went  and  killing   two more  hostiles. The  hostiles  lost  ten  men  in  the  encounter  and  left  behind  two  rifles, one 12 bore  gun  and  one  tommy  gun. The  attack  dealt  a  crushing  blow  to  the hostiles  and  led  to  the  eventual  destruction  of  their  position. Throughout  this period,  he  repeatedly  showed  conspicuous  bravery,  unselfishness  and    indomitable  courage  in  very  difficult  and   dangerous  situations.

Later life and death
After retiring from the Indian Army, Rai settled at Jorhat in Assam. He died there on 14 February 2011, aged 97, and was accorded full military honours by the Assam Rifles at his funeral. The Assam Rifles named an auditorium at their Shillong HQ in honour of Rai.

Awards

References

1914 births
2011 deaths
People from Darjeeling district
Recipients of the Military Cross
Recipients of the Indian Distinguished Service Medal
Indian Army personnel of World War II
Military personnel from West Bengal
Indian Army personnel
Recipients of the Ashoka Chakra (military decoration)
Ashoka Chakra
Rai people